Harboe may refer to:

People
 Ludvig Harboe, Danish bishop
 Rasmus Harboe, Danish sculptor
 Felipe Harboe, Chilean politician

Other
 Harboes Bryggeri, Danish brewery